Norfolkia is a genus of triplefins in the family Tripterygiidae. They are found I the Indo-Pacific region.

Species
There are four species currently recognised in Norfolkia:

 Tropical scaly-headed triplefin, Norfolkia brachylepis (Schultz, 1960)
 Leeuwin triplefin, Norfolkia leeuwin Fricke, 1994
 Scalyhead triplefin, Norfolkia squamiceps (McCulloch & Waite, 1916)
 Thomas' triplefin, Norfolkia thomasi Whitley, 1964

Etymology
Fowler described Norfolkia lairdi from a type collected  at Kingston, Norfolk Island and named the new genus after the island.

References

 
Tripterygiidae